Rameshbabu Vaishali (born 21 June 2001) is an Indian chess player from Chennai who holds the FIDE titles of International Master (IM) and Woman Grandmaster (WGM).

Personal life
Vaishali Rameshbabu born in a Tamil family in Chennai. She is the elder sibling of Grandmaster R Praggnanandhaa. Her father, Rameshbabu, works at TNSC Bank as a branch manager. Her mother, Nagalakshmi, is a homemaker.

Career 
Vaishali won the Girls' World Youth Chess Championship for Under-12s in 2012 and Under-14s in 2015. In 2016, she received the Woman International Master (WIM) title. , she is ranked second in India and World No.12 girl U16-player. At that time, she had an Elo rating of 2300.
 
She became a Woman Grandmaster (WGM) by completing her final norm in the Riga Technical University Open chess tournament in Riga, Latvia on 12 August 2018.

Vaishali was the part of the Gold medal-winning team at Online Olympiad 2020, where India won its first ever medal.

She received her International Master (IM) title in 2021. In 2022, Vaishali won the 8th Fischer Memorial, scoring 7.0/9 and winning her second Grandmaster norm.

Vaishali was invited to participate in the FIDE Women's Speed Chess Championship 2022, where she defeated the Women's World Blitz Chess Champion Bibisara Assaubayeva in the round of 16, and compatriot Harika Dronavalli in the quarterfinals.

Vaishali played on Board 3 in the Women's section at the 44th Chess Olympiad at Mamallapuram, Chennai, in July-Aug 2022. India Women team won the Team bronze medal, and Vaishali won individual bronze medal for Board 3.

References

External links 
 
 
 Vaishali wins Indian Women Challengers

2001 births
Living people
Indian female chess players
Chess woman grandmasters
Chess International Masters
World Youth Chess Champions
21st-century Indian women
21st-century Indian people
Sportswomen from Tamil Nadu
Sportspeople from Chennai